Ahus may refer to:

Akershus University Hospital, a hospital near Oslo, Norway
Åhus, a Swedish town
Atypical Hemolytic-uremic syndrome, commonly abbreviated "aHUS"